The Huntsville Hawks are Junior "C" box lacrosse team from Huntsville, Ontario, Canada.  The Hawks play in the Ontario Junior C Lacrosse League.  They were known as the Huntsville Legionaires in 1965, Huntsville Tornadoes in 1966, and as the Huntsville Hawks from 1967 to the present.

History
The Hawks were one of the oldest running Junior "B" teams in lacrosse prior to 2010.  The Hawks won the second ever National title, then known as the Castrol Cup in their inaugural season.  They also pulled off a second National title in 1991, winning the Founders Cup.

Since their last Founders Cup, the Hawks have found it hard to draw top talent to the Huntsville area and their season results have suffered.  The team also had to fold in 2000 to rebuild some of its interior structure.  The fold happened after a winless 1999 season.  Since another winless season in 2004, the past two season have gone a little smoother for the Hawks with two straight 6-14-0 seasons.  In 2007 the club almost went .500, only to suffer through yet another winless season in 2008. Although there were marginal gains in 2009 & 2010, it is clear the Hawks were going to have a tough time competing going forward.

At the 2010 OLA AGM, the Hawks asked for admission into the OLA Jr. C Lacrosse League, dropping from Jr. B.

1991 Founders Cup
At the end of the 1991 season, the Hawks were in 4th place overall with a 13-5-0 record.  With home advantage in the first round of the playoffs, they drew the fifth seed Gloucester Griffins.  The Griffins did not provide much of a challenge as the Hawks swept them 3 games to none.  In the league semi-final, the Hawks drew the first place Scarborough Saints in a best-of-seven series.  After dropping the first two games, the Hawks walked through them in four straight.  The finals saw them take on the second seed Elora Mohawks.  In another upset, the Hawks again lost the first two games, only to take the next four to clinch the Provincial title.  The 1991 Founders Cup was played in the host city of Gloucester, Ontario.  In their opening game, Huntsville once again met their first round playoff opponents, the host team Gloucester Griffins and beat them by a 12–5 score.  The Hawks next met the West Coast champion Delta Islanders, and dropped a close decision 10–9.  Next came the Manitoba team, whom the Hawks defeated easily.  Thanks to a defeat for the Islanders at the hands of the Griffins,  Huntsville qualified for the finals, wherein they defeated Gloucester 18–6 to claim the 1991 Founders Cup.

Season-by-season results
Note: GP = Games played, W = Wins, L = Losses, T = Ties, Pts = Points, GF = Goals for, GA = Goals against

External links
Hawks Webpage
The Bible of Lacrosse
Unofficial OLA Page

Huntsville, Ontario
Ontario Lacrosse Association teams